The Leaf River is a  tributary of the Crow Wing River in west-central Minnesota in the United States.  Via the Crow Wing, it is part of the Mississippi River watershed.

Course
The Leaf rises from the Leaf Lakes chain (West, Middle and East) in northeastern Otter Tail County and flows generally east past the town of Bluffton into southern Wadena County. On the Crow between the Leaf and Partridge rivers are sites of pre-settlement fur trading posts.

The Leaf's largest tributaries are the Wing River and the Redeye River, both of which join it in Wadena County.

Culture
Leaf River serves as land-cession boundary for the 1847 Treaty of Washington, signed between the Pillager Chippewas and the United States, and for the land-cession boundaries for the 1855 Treaty of Washington, signed between the Mississippi Chippewas, Pillager Chippewas and the United States.  The land ceded to the United States by the Pillagers in 1847 was sold to the Menomini, but the Menomini refused removal out of Wisconsin and subsequently sold the land to the United States in 1854.

fishing
Fishing is popular on the leaf river. Species that resides in the leaf river include walleye, rock bass, Northern Pike, Carp and suckers.

See also
List of rivers of Minnesota

References

Rivers of Otter Tail County, Minnesota
Rivers of Minnesota
Rivers of Wadena County, Minnesota
Tributaries of the Mississippi River